is a city located in Ishikawa Prefecture, Japan. , the city had an estimated population of 49,660 people in 21,809 households. Nanao is the fifth largest city by population in Ishikawa, behind Kanazawa, Hakusan, Komatsu, and Kaga.

Geography
Nanao occupies the southeastern coast of Noto Peninsula and is bordered by the Sea of Japan on the east and north, and Toyama Prefecture to the south. Parts of the city are within the borders of the Noto Hantō Quasi-National Park. The name "Nanao" (七尾) literally means "Seven Tails" and is said to be named for the seven mountain ridges (or "tails") surrounding Nanao that are visible when viewed from Joyama (七尾城山), site of the city's historical castle ruins. These ridges are called Kikuo (菊尾, "Chrysanthemum Tail"), Kameo (亀尾, "Turtle Tail"), Matsuo (松尾, "Pine Tail"), Torano'o (虎尾, "Tiger Tail"), Takeo (竹尾, "Bamboo Tail"), Umeo (梅尾, "Plum Tail"), and Tatsuo (龍尾, "Dragon Tail").

Neighbouring municipalities 
Ishikawa Prefecture
Nakanoto
Shika
Anamizu
Toyama Prefecture
Himi

Climate
Nanao has a humid continental climate (Köppen Cfa) characterized by mild summers and cold winters with heavy snowfall.  The average annual temperature in Nanao is 13.7 °C. The average annual rainfall is 2392 mm with September as the wettest month. The temperatures are highest on average in August, at around 26.0 °C, and lowest in January, at around 2.9 °C.

Demographics
Per Japanese census data, the population of Nanao has declined over the past 40 years.

History 

The area around Nanao was part of ancient Noto Province and contained the Nara period provincial capital and provincial temple. During the Sengoku Period (1467–1568), Nanao Castle was a major stronghold of the Hatakeyama clan, and was contested by the Uesugi clan and Maeda clan. The area became part Kaga Domain under the Edo period Tokugawa shogunate, with the exception of the Tsuruhama area, which was retained by the shogunate directly as tenryō territory.

Following the Meiji restoration, the area was organised into Kashima District, Ishikawa. The town of Nanao was established with the creation of the modern municipalities system on April 1, 1889. It was raised to city status on July 20, 1939.

On October 1, 2004, Nanao expanded by annexing the neighbouring municipalities of Nakajima, Notojima and Tatsuruhama (all from Kashima District).

On March 25, 2007, the 2007 Noto earthquake caused some property damage in Nanao, but no fatalities.

Government
Nanao has a mayor-council form of government with a directly elected mayor and a unicameral city legislature of 18 members.

Economy 
Nanao is a regional commercial centre and a seaport on the Sea of Japan. Manufacturing, especially of bricks and cement, lumber processing, tourism, and agriculture are all major contributors  of the local economy.

Education
Nanao has 13 public elementary schools and four middle schools operated by the city government, and four public high school operated by the Ishikawa Prefectural Board of Education. There is also one private high school. The prefecture also operates one special education school.

Transportation

Railway
  West Japan Railway Company - Nanao Line
 -  - 
 Noto Railway - Nanao Line
 - -  -  -  -

Highway

Seaports
Port of Nanao

Local attractions

Ishikawa Nanao Art Museum
Notojima Glass Art Museum
Wakura Onsen
Susoezoana Kofun
Nanao Castle site
Noto Kokubun-ji site
Yamanotera

In popular culture
The manga series Kimi wa Hōkago Insomnia and its live-action and anime adaptations take place in Nanao.

Notable people from Nanao
 Min Ayahana, manga artist
 Hasegawa Tōhaku, ancient Japanese painter
 Wajima Hiroshi, sumo wrestler
 Kenta Matsudaira, Professional Table Tennis player

Sister city relations
  Jinzhou, Dalian, Liaoning, China
  Gimcheon, North Gyeongsang, South Korea
  Bratsk, Irkutsk Oblast, Russia
  Monterey, California, United States
  Morgantown, Kentucky, United States

References

External links

 
 
 A list of festivals and events in Nanao 

 
Cities in Ishikawa Prefecture
Port settlements in Japan
Populated coastal places in Japan